The 2001 Rochester mayoral election took place on November 6, 2001 in the city of Rochester, New York, United States. Incumbent William A. Johnson Jr. was elected to a third term as mayor of Rochester.

Candidates

William A. Johnson Jr. - incumbent mayor
Luis Perez - pastor

Results

References

2001 New York (state) elections
History of Rochester, New York
Mayoral elections in Rochester, New York
Rochester